"Elvis Presley and America" is a song by Irish rock band U2, and is the ninth track on their 1984 album, The Unforgettable Fire.

This song was almost entirely a spur of the moment creation. Musically, it takes its instrumentation from a slowed down backing track of "A Sort of Homecoming". Producer Daniel Lanois said that he became frustrated while mixing that song and consequently slowed down the tape recording from 30 inches per second to 22. The vocals are the result of producer Brian Eno encouraging lead singer Bono to improvise lyrics while listening to the music for the first time. During the sole performance, Bono assumed that this was a rough cut—something that could be tightened up, altered and corrected later. However, it was the pure improvisation and continuity of performance (as opposed to editing together several performances into one piece) that Eno was interested in, and it is this track that ended up on the final product.

Bono described this track as a reaction to an Albert Goldman biography of Elvis Presley which was not flattering to the late singer. This would not be the last time that Bono disagreed with Goldman's portrayal of a rock legend. The singer would later call out Goldman by name in "God Part II" (1988), this time in reference to an unflattering biography that Goldman wrote about John Lennon.

Composition
"Elvis Presley and America" is in the key of E. The song has a tempo of 92 BPM.

References

U2 songs
1984 songs
Songs about Elvis Presley
Song recordings produced by Brian Eno
Song recordings produced by Daniel Lanois
Songs written by Bono
Songs written by the Edge
Songs written by Adam Clayton
Songs written by Larry Mullen Jr.